The 1962–63 Norwegian 1. Divisjon season was the 24th season of ice hockey in Norway. Eight teams participated in the league, and Valerenga Ishockey won the championship.

Regular season

External links 
 Norwegian Ice Hockey Federation

Nor
GET-ligaen seasons
1962 in Norwegian sport
1963 in Norwegian sport